Futboll Klub Tepelena is an Albanian football club based on Tepelenë, founded in 1945. Their home ground is "Sabaudin Shehu Stadium". The team currently plays in the Kategoria e Dytë, Group B.

Current squad

 (Captain)

References

External links
 FK Tepelena Facebook
 FK Tepelena Twitter
 FK Tepelena Instagram

Tepelena
Association football clubs established in 1945
1945 establishments in Albania
SK Tepelena
Sport in Tepelenë
Kategoria e Dytë clubs